The George Benson Collection is a compilation album by George Benson, released in 1981. Originally a two-LP set, it was reissued as one compact disc. In addition to previously released material from Benson's tenures with A&M Records, CTI Records, and his then-current label, Warner Bros. Records, the album features two new songs, including Benson's #1 R&B hit "Turn Your Love Around." The George Benson Collection was certified gold by the RIAA.

Track listing
All tracks originally performed by Benson, except where indicated.

NOTE: "Cast Your Fate to the Wind" was omitted from the album's CD release due to the 74-minute storage capacity of CDs at the time.

Charts

Weekly Charts

Year End Charts

Certifications

References

George Benson albums
1981 compilation albums
Albums produced by Creed Taylor
Albums produced by Tommy LiPuma
Albums produced by Quincy Jones
Albums produced by Arif Mardin
Albums produced by Michael Masser
Warner Records compilation albums